Calliostoma waikanae forsteriana is a subspecies of medium-sized sea snail, a marine gastropod mollusc in the family Calliostomatidae, the calliostoma top snails.

Description
The height of the shell attains 45 mm.

Distribution
This marine species occurs off New Zealand.

References
 Marshall, 1995. A revision of the recent Calliostoma species of New Zealand (Mollusca:Gastropoda:Trochoidea). The Nautilus 108(4):83-127

External links

Further reading 
 Powell A. W. B., New Zealand Mollusca, William Collins Publishers Ltd, Auckland, New Zealand 1979 

waikanae
Gastropods of New Zealand